Jack Napier may refer to:

 Jack Napier (actor)
 Joker (Jack Napier), the real name of the Joker in the 1989 film Batman

See also 
 John Napier (disambiguation)